The R490 is a regional road in Ireland linking the N52 at Borrisokane, County Tipperary via Cloughjordan to the R445 at Moneygall, County Offaly.

See also
 Roads in Ireland - (Primary National Roads)
 Secondary Roads

References

Regional roads in the Republic of Ireland
Roads in County Tipperary
Roads in County Offaly
Borrisokane